Cliff Almond may refer to:

 Cliff Almond (musician), American drummer and percussion player
 Cliff Almond (soccer) (1930–2018), Australian soccer player